The canton of Châteauponsac is an administrative division of the Haute-Vienne department, western France. Its borders were modified at the French canton reorganisation which came into effect in March 2015. Its seat is in Châteauponsac.

It consists of the following communes:
 
Arnac-la-Poste
Azat-le-Ris
Balledent
La Bazeuge
Châteauponsac
La Croix-sur-Gartempe
Cromac
Dinsac
Dompierre-les-Églises
Le Dorat
Droux
Les Grands-Chézeaux
Jouac
Lussac-les-Églises
Magnac-Laval
Mailhac-sur-Benaize
Oradour-Saint-Genest
Rancon
Saint-Amand-Magnazeix
Saint-Georges-les-Landes
Saint-Hilaire-la-Treille
Saint-Léger-Magnazeix
Saint-Martin-le-Mault
Saint-Ouen-sur-Gartempe
Saint-Sornin-la-Marche
Saint-Sornin-Leulac
Saint-Sulpice-les-Feuilles
Tersannes
Val-d'Oire-et-Gartempe
Verneuil-Moustiers
Villefavard

References

Cantons of Haute-Vienne